Trenton Mills is an unincorporated community in Cumberland County, in the U.S. state of Virginia.

References

Built c. 1790, rebuilt later. -story stone with gable roof; extant dam; machinery in place. Interior in poor condition. Partial roof collapse.

Unincorporated communities in Virginia
Unincorporated communities in Cumberland County, Virginia